6/49 may refer to:

 Lotto 6/49, a lottery in Canada
 Super Lotto 6/49, a lottery in the Philippines